Manfred Johannes Leuchter (born 15 June 1960 in Würselen, Germany) is a German accordionist, composer, pianist and producer of various musical genres. His stylistic influences include rock and pop, jazz and ballads, as well as African and Middle Eastern music.

In the early 2000s, and invited by the German Goethe-Institut, Leuchter toured with his jazz band in India, Romania, Morocco, Syria, Jordan, Egypt, Palestine and Lebanon. Following encounters with local musicians, he performed and recorded with the Hewar jazz fusion band from Syria or with oud player Driss el Maloumi in Morocco. Leuchter lives and works in Aachen, Germany, and also lived for extended stays in Marrakesh, Morocco.

In addition, Leuchter works as a producer for various artists, such as German singer-songwriter Reinhard Mey, for whom he has produced various albums and played in live concerts. Further, he is also a sound engineer as well as composer of music for theatre productions.

Lineup
Duo: Manfred Leuchter (accordion); Ian Melrose (fingerstyle guitar, whistles)
Trio: Manfred Leuchter (accordion); Afra Mussawisade (percussion); Florian Zenker (guitar)
Quartet: Manfred Leuchter (accordion); Steffen Thormählen (drums, percussion); Antoine Pütz (electric bass, guembri); Sebastian Pottmeier or Heribert Leuchter (bass, alto, soprano saxophone)

Discography
Manfred Leuchter on discogs
Theaterkompositionen (1999)
 Sparito (2000)
 Arabesque (2001)
 Nomade, with Heribert Leuchter (2003)
 Pas de Trois, Trio with Afra Mussawisade and Karim Othman-Hassan (2004)
 Space (2004)
 Zina (2006)
 Nine days of Solitude, The Damascus Session with Hewar and Lena Chamamyan (2007)
 Vis à Vis(2008)
 Kein schöner Land (2011)
 Carpe Momentum (2012)

References

External links 

 

 Manfred Leuchter personal story in English
 Manfred Leuchter on Youtube

1960 births
Living people
German accordionists
German male composers
German jazz musicians
German record producers
People from Würselen
21st-century accordionists
German male pianists
21st-century pianists
21st-century German male musicians